Eppendorf, a company with its registered office in Germany, develops, produces and sells products and services for laboratories around the world.

Eppendorf products are used in academic and industrial research laboratories, e.g. in companies in the pharmaceutical, biotech, chemical and food industries. They are also used in laboratories that perform clinical or environmental analysis, in forensic laboratories, and in industrial laboratories where industrial process analysis, production and quality assurance are performed. Eppendorf describes its business as consisting of three divisions: liquid handling, cell handling, and sample handling.

Products
Eppendorf develops, produces and sells devices, consumables and services for laboratories. The liquid handling line includes products such as manual and electronic micropipettes, automated pipetting systems, and milliliter pipette controllers. The cell handling line includes products such as fermenters and bioreactors and cell culture supplies. The sample handling line includes products such as centrifuges and related accessories, PCR equipment, laboratory freezers, and reagent tubes.

History
Eppendorf was founded in 1945 by Heinrich Netheler and Hans Hinz in the Hamburg district of Eppendorf on the grounds of the University Hospital Eppendorf, originally as a workshop for medical devices. Dr Netheler and Dr Hinz developed the first ultrasound device and the stimulator, a machine used for diagnosing and therapeutically treating muscle and nerve damage. They also invented an electrical thermometer (the “Thermorapid”) that, for the first time, enabled body temperature to be measured in just a few seconds.

In 1954, the company was renamed "Netheler & Hinz GmbH". In 2000, Eppendorf Gerätebau, Netheler und Hinz GmbH was renamed Eppendorf AG and became a public company.

In 1961, Eppendorf launched the microliter pipette system. This allowed precise measurement of liquids. The first microcentrifuge was sold in 1962.

In 1965, the company moved to a facility at the Barkhausenweg in the Hamburg district of Hummelsbüttel, where Eppendorf has been headquartered ever since.

Since December 2019, Eva van Pelt and Peter Fruhstorfer lead the Eppendorf Group as Co-CEOs. They follow Thomas Bachmann, who took over as Chairman in 2015 from Dirk Ehlers. In 2011, Ehlers had replaced Klaus Fink, who had been Chairman of the Executive Board for many years, who then took over as Chairman of the Supervisory Board until 2016. Philipp von Loeper has been Chairman of the Supervisory Board of Eppendorf AG since 2016.

Eppendorf sponsors awards for investigators which are awarded through Science Magazine.

Acquisitions
In 2007, Eppendorf took over New Brunswick Scientific Co., an American company headquartered in Edison, New Jersey. In January 2012, Eppendorf acquired DASGIP, a mid-sized German company headquartered in Jülich, Germany that manufactured parallel bioreactor systems. Eppendorf acquired Calibration Technology Ltd, headquartered in Limerick, Ireland, in November 2016 in order to expand its service presence into Ireland.

References

External links
 

Manufacturing companies established in 1945
Research support companies
Manufacturing companies based in Hamburg
German companies established in 1945